Huishan railway station is a railway station of Shanghai–Nanjing Intercity Railway located in Huishan District, Wuxi, Jiangsu, People's Republic of China. In the future, the Yancheng–Yixing intercity railway will pass through this station.

References

Railway stations in Jiangsu
Stations on the Shanghai–Nanjing Intercity Railway